Alfred Hayhoe was a British racehorse trainer. He was Champion Trainer in 1896.

British racehorse trainers